William Frankland may refer to:

William Frankland (died 1640), of Thirkleby, MP for Thirsk during the reign of Charles I
Sir William Frankland, 1st Baronet (c. 1640–1697), of Thirkleby, English politician, MP for Thirsk
William Frankland (died 1714), FRS, son of Sir Thomas Frankland, 2nd Baronet
William Frankland (1720–1805), East India Company merchant and MP for Thirsk
William Frankland (1761–1816), English politician and Lord Commissioner of the Admiralty
William Howard Frankland (1901–1980), American businessman
William Frankland (allergist) (1912–2020), British allergist and immunologist